Swift-Kyle House, also known as the Swift Mansion and Billings House, is a historic residence in Columbus, Georgia. It was added to the National Register of Historic Places on April 11, 1973. It is located at 303 12th Street and 3rd Avenue. George Parker Swift and his daughter and son-in-law owned the mansion which dates from the antebellum period. It dates to 1857 and was remodeled after a roof fire in 1898 Adelaide and Hames P. Kyle also owned the home. It was a residence until 1956 and has also been used by the Columbus Travel Bureau.

See also
National Register of Historic Places listings in Muscogee County, Georgia

References

Houses in Columbus, Georgia
Houses on the National Register of Historic Places in Georgia (U.S. state)
Greek Revival houses in Georgia (U.S. state)
Houses completed in 1898
National Register of Historic Places in Muscogee County, Georgia
1857 establishments in Georgia (U.S. state)